The Mudhafaria Minaret is a minaret located in the new Minare Park on the west region of Erbil, Kurdistan Region, Iraq.

The minaret is 36 m (118 ft) high, was built in 1190–1232 AD (586–630 AH) by the Turcoman prince of Erbil, in the reign of Saladin, Muzaffar Al-Din Abu Sa’eed Al-Kawkaboori (Gökböri) who had entered in the obedience of Saladin without war and married his sister.

The minaret is composed of a high octagonal base and a tall cylindrical shaft, with a balcony located between the base and the shaft.

It is built of baked bricks, the base being decorated with two tiers of niches with pointed arches, two on each of the eight faces that are inscribed in rectangular frames. The balcony parapet is carved with twenty-four small niches, the access door to the minaret steps is on the eastern side of the octagonal base and leads top to the balcony. From there a small door gives access to steps inside the cylindrical shaft that led to the second balcony now collapsed.

The shaft tapers inward and is decorated with several bands of interlocking diagonal Hazar-Baf motifs that are separated with thin bands. Examples of Kufi calligraphy can be seen, showing the names of Muhammad and Mas'oudi Muhammadi, the builders of the Minaret.

References

External links

 History page
 Minaret of the Great Mosque of Arbil - ArchNet

Religious buildings and structures completed in 1232
Towers completed in the 13th century
Buildings and structures in Erbil
Minarets in Iraq
Tourist attractions in Iraqi Kurdistan